Saucy Jack and the Space Vixens is a cult science fiction musical reminiscent of The Rocky Horror Show.  The 2006 West End run starred Faye Tozer and was choreographed by Bruno Tonioli.  The cast interact with the audience as if the audience were patrons of the club in which the musical is set.

Story

The story revolves around a cabaret club called "Saucy Jack's", at which the performers become the victims of a serial killer as they try to leave to better themselves elsewhere. Step in the Space Vixens in their role as investigators and upholders of the oath.
As well as Rocky Horror there are clearly influences of Barbarella as the Vixens' interrogation device the Vibratron appears to be similar to the Orgasmatron of that movie and the Vixens' characters more than a little like Jane Fonda's character in that movie.
Musically the influences are predominantly Disco with a catchy original score.

Characters
 'Saucy' Jack De 'Ath - proprietor of Saucy Jack's Cabaret Bar
 Honey Tipps/Jubilee Climax - Leader of the Vixens
 Bunny Lingus - Space Vixen
 Anna Labia - Space Vixen
 Booby Shevalle - Cocktail waitress at Saucy Jack's
 Shirley Tristar/Chesty Prospects - Intergalactic smuggler
 Sammy Sax - House saxophonist
 Dr Wilhelm von Whackoff - Psychoanalyst
 Mitch Maypole - Barman at Saucy Jack's.

History
In 1995 a group of four former students of the University of Kent, Johanna Allitt, Simon Curtis, Mike Fidler and Charlotte Mann, set out to stage a production at the Edinburgh Fringe festival. Their desired production Leonard Bernstein's "Candide" was already going to be playing and so instead they wrote their own piece.

The show was made available for amateur licence in 2004 through Samuel French Ltd., and continues to be played by amateur groups mainly in the UK and USA.

References 

At the Edinburgh Fringe 2010, it was performed for 26 nights at original venue C Too by The Unlucky Theatre Company a group of teenagers from North London.

In September 2011 the YOUtheatre Partnership production of Saucy Jack and the Space Vixens sold out an entire week's run at the Epsom Playhouse.

The most recent production of Saucy Jack and the Space Vixens was in 2016 at the King's Head Theatre directed by Michael Fidler. The cast included Hugh Stubbins (Saucy Jack), Jamie Birkett (Jubilee Climax), Kristopher Bosch (Mitch Maypole), Casper Cordwell-James (Booby Shevalle), Lorna Hall (Anna Labia), Tom Whalley (Dr Willy von Whackoff), Ashton Charge (Sammy Sax) and Sophie Cordwell-James (Chesty/Vulva/Shirley). The show ran from 26 April to 21 May gaining five star critical acclaim.

External links
 Official website
 Official Show Facebook page
 label

1995 musicals
West End musicals
Science fiction musicals
British musicals